Vanja Hedvig Desideria Blomberg (later Webjörn, born 28 January 1929) is a retired Swedish gymnast. She was part of the Swedish teams that won gold medals at the 1950 World Artistic Gymnastics Championships (all-around) and 1952 Summer Olympics (team portable apparatus). She was the national all-around champion in 1950 and attended the 1956 Olympics as a coach.

References

External link
 

1929 births
Living people
Swedish female artistic gymnasts
Gymnasts at the 1952 Summer Olympics
Olympic gymnasts of Sweden
Olympic gold medalists for Sweden
Medalists at the 1952 Summer Olympics
Medalists at the World Artistic Gymnastics Championships
Olympic medalists in gymnastics
Sportspeople from Gothenburg
20th-century Swedish women